This is a list of notable shopping malls in Austria.
Some are in suburbs outside the cities indicated.

Salzburg
Forum1
Europark

Carinthia
Klagenfurt
City-Arkaden
Südpark
Villach
Atrio
VEZ
Neukauf
Spittal
Stadtpark Center Spittal
Wolfsberg
Einkaufszentrum TENORIO 

Lower Austria
 Shopping City Süd
 G3 Shopping Resort Gerasdorf

Styria
Graz
Shopping City Seiersberg
Murpark
CityPark

Vorarlberg
Dornbirn
Messepark

Vienna
 Gasometer
 Donauzentrum
LugnerCity
 Galeria Landstraße
 Wien Mitte - The Mall
 Auhof Center
 Einkaufszentrum Simmering
 BahnhofCity Wien Hauptbahnhof
 BahnhofCity Wien Westbahnhof
 Q9

Austria
Shopping malls